Acompsia subpunctella is a moth of the family Gelechiidae. It is found in Sweden, Finland, Estonia, Latvia, north-western Poland and Russia (the Kola Peninsula, Altai and Transbaikalia).

The forewings are greyish brown, mottled with faint light yellow. The hindwings are greyish brown. Females have more light greyish and yellow in the forewings. Adults are on wing from late June to July.

The larvae feed on Veronica longifolia within the shoots or stems. Larvae can be found in September. There are reports that the larvae hibernate in the stem of the host plant and pupate there in spring. However, this is disputed by other authors, who believe the larvae leave the shoot or stem to pupate.

References

External links

Moths described in 1966
Acompsia
Moths of Europe
Moths of Asia